Ranunculus occidentalis, the western buttercup, is a species of buttercup found in the western regions of North America. Its distribution extends from Alaska through British Columbia and Alberta to central California.

Aleut first nations may have used juice from the plant as a poison, its toxicity arising from the substance protoanemonin. Shasta first nations coincided blooming Ranunculus occidentalis with salmon runs in the summer. The seeds were used to make pinole, a staple food.

This plant is similar to, and sometimes difficult to distinguish from, the California buttercup (Ranunculus californicus).

References

External links
Washington Burke Museum
Photo gallery

occidentalis
Flora of North America
Plants described in 1838